The 1932 East Tennessee State Teachers football team was an American football team that represented East Tennessee State Teacher's College, Johnson City—now known as East Tennessee State University (ETSU)—as a member of the Smoky Mountain Conference in the 1932 college football season. They were led by first-year head coach Gene McMurray, who was a graduate of Maryville College. He was one of few coaches in the South to hold a doctorate. Prior to coaching for the school, he coached at Erwin and Rockwood High Schools, and also spent three years at Milligan College. For the first time since 1928, the Teachers did not have a losing record, finishing 3–3–1.

Schedule

References

East Tennessee State Teachers
East Tennessee State Buccaneers football seasons
East Tennessee State Teachers football